Kuwait of the Sustainability (Arabic: كويت الاستدامة) is a political economic book by Abdullah Al-Salloum. The book, subtitled "Vision of a people, from and to them." (Arabic: رؤية شعب، منه وإليه), extensively highlights the Kuwaiti economy in particular, aiming at clarifying the concept of sound economic vision through radical solutions targeting macro-economic issues of the state.

In this title, which is introduced with appraisals by Prof. Ghanim Al-Najjar – the political science professor at Kuwait University –, Ali Al-Sanad, Ph.D. – the Islamic studies professor at the General Authority for Applied Education and Training –, and Mr. Mohammed Al-Yousifi – the historical researcher and political analyst –, the author looks forward to raise the awareness of the economic sense; in a way that makes individuals see and understand the consequences of political and administrative decision-making outcomes, build their own view and critical opinion while being fully aware of the subject matter.

The title concludes that moving Kuwait from rent to sustainability requires a major reform at the macro-economic level, a reform whose impact would wipe all political, organizational behavioral, and micro-economic obstacles facing the state.

External links 
 Title website
 Kuwait of the Sustainability: Interview with the author – FM89.5 Radio Kuwait

References 

Economics books
2018 non-fiction books
21st-century Arabic books